Midlothian Independent School District is a public school district based in Midlothian, Texas, United States.

In addition to Midlothian, the district serves parts of Cedar Hill, Mansfield, Grand Prairie, Ovilla, and Venus as well as rural areas in northwestern Ellis County.

2015 TEA rating 
In 2015, the district received the "Met Standard" rating by the Texas Education Agency. All 9 individual Midlothian ISD campuses also met the standard in 2015.  Two new schools, Midlothian Heritage High School and McClatchey Elementary School, were not rated for 2015 as they were brand new schools at the time.

Schools

High school (grades 9–12)

Midlothian High School
Midlothian Heritage High School

Middle schools (grades 6–8)
Dieterich Middle School
Frank Seale Middle School
Walnut Grove Middle School

Elementary schools (grades PK–5)
T.E. Baxter Elementary School
J.R. Irvin Elementary School
Longbranch Elementary School
Dolores W McClatchey Elementary School
LaRue Miller Elementary School
Mt. Peak Elementary School
J.A. Vitovsky Elementary School
Jean Coleman Elementary School

Colleges
Navarro College operates its Midlothian campus at the high school as well as having a small campus located in the town.  This includes its partnership arrangement with Texas A&M-Commerce and most recently Tarleton State University.

External links

Midlothian ISD

References

School districts in Ellis County, Texas
Mansfield, Texas